= Church Hollow =

Valley in the state of New York

Coordinates: 42.8003477°N 73.3389981°W

Church Hollow is a valley in the U.S. state of New York.

Church Hollow takes its name from the local Church family.
